Ksenia Genrikhovna Caesar (1889 – after 1939) was a Russian and Soviet figure skater.

She was a five-time champion of Russia in ladies' single skating (in 1911, 1912, 1914, 1914, and 1915) and the 1939 champion of the USSR.

Competitive highlights

References

External links 
 Ksenia Caesar at Fskate.ru

Russian female single skaters
Soviet female single skaters
1889 births 
Year of death missing
Soviet figure skating coaches